Sunday Creek is a locality in central Victoria, Australia. The locality is in the Shire of Mitchell local government area, 82 kilometers (51 mi) north of the state capital, Melbourne.

References 

Towns in Victoria (Australia)
Shire of Mitchell